Madrid is a town in Houston County, Alabama, United States. It is part of the Dothan, Alabama Metropolitan Statistical Area. At the 2010 census the population was 350, up from 303 in 2000.

History
Madrid was founded in 1905 by land speculator J.B. Dell and Ed Watford Sr. J.B. bought much land around the intersection of the Bay Line Railroad and a dirt road. He and his partner (who may be Ed Watford) divided the land into lots for sale.

Geography
U.S. Route 231 passes through the west side of the town, leading north  to Dothan and south  to Cottondale, Florida.

Demographics

2020 census

As of the 2020 United States census, there were 265 people, 117 households, and 78 families residing in the town.

2000 census
As of the census of 2000, there were 303 people, 119 households, and 89 families residing in the town. The racial makeup of the town was 82.84% White, 16.17% Black or African American, 0.33% Asian, and 0.66% from two or more races.

There were 119 households, out of which 42.0% had children under the age of 18 living with them, 60.5% were married couples living together, 10.9% had a female householder with no husband present, and 24.4% were non-families. 20.2% of all households were made up of individuals, and 12.6% had someone living alone who was 65 years of age or older. The average household size was 2.55 and the average family size was 2.96.

In the town, the population was spread out, with 29.4% under the age of 18, 6.6% from 18 to 24, 33.0% from 25 to 44, 19.1% from 45 to 64, and 11.9% who were 65 years of age or older. The median age was 34 years. For every 100 females, there were 85.9 males. For every 100 females age 18 and over, there were 86.1 males.

The median income for a household in the town was $14,943, and the median income for a family was $21,563. Males had a median income of $25,000 versus $16,563 for females. The per capita income for the town was $10,409. About 18.1% of families and 30.9% of the population were below the poverty line, including 31.6% of those under the age of eighteen and 51.5% of those 65 or over.

References 

Towns in Alabama
Towns in Houston County, Alabama
Dothan metropolitan area, Alabama